The 1989 Team Ice Racing World Championship was the 11th edition of the Team World Championship. The final was held on ?, 1989, in Assen in the Netherlands. The Soviet Union won their ninth title.

Classification

See also 
 1989 Individual Ice Speedway World Championship
 1989 Speedway World Team Cup in classic speedway
 1989 Individual Speedway World Championship in classic speedway

References 

Ice speedway competitions
World